James or Jim Duckworth may refer to:
Sir James Duckworth (1840–1915), British businessman and Liberal Member of Parliament
James Duckworth (1869–1937), British businessman and son of Sir James Duckworth
James Duckworth (tennis) (born 1992), Australian tennis player
Sir James Edward Dyce Duckworth, 5th Baronet (born 1984), of the Duckworth baronets
Jim Duckworth (baseball) (born 1939), baseball pitcher
Jim Duckworth (musician) (born 1957), American blues guitarist
Jim Duckworth (rugby league) (1908–1967), Australian rugby league player, coach and administrator
James Duckworth (rugby league) (born 1994), English rugby league player